A Soul at Stake is a 1916 American silent short Oriental drama based on a book written by John Fleming Wilson and scenarioized by Calder Johnstone. It was directed by and starring William Garwood, Andrew Arbuckle and Lois Wilson.

References

External links

1916 drama films
1916 films
Silent American drama films
American silent short films
American black-and-white films
1916 short films
1910s American films